Crazy to Marry is a 1921 American silent comedy film directed by James Cruze and starring Fatty Arbuckle. Prints are held by Cinematheque Royale de Belgique, Brussels and Gosfilmofond, Russian State Archive, Moscow.

Cast

 Roscoe 'Fatty' Arbuckle as Dr. Hobart Hupp
 Lila Lee as Annabelle Landis
 Laura Anson as Estrella De Morgan
 Edwin Stevens as Henry De Morgan
 Lillian Leighton as Sarah De Morgan
 Bull Montana as Dago Red (a crook)
 Allen Durnell as Arthur Simmons
 Sidney Bracey as Col. Landis
 Genevieve Blinn as Mrs. Landis
 Clarence Burton as Gregory Slade (a lawyer)
 Henry Johnson as Norman Gregory
 Charles Ogle as Cement man
 Jackie Young as Cupid
 Lucien Littlefield as Minister

References

External links

1921 films
1921 comedy films
Silent American comedy films
American silent feature films
American black-and-white films
Films directed by James Cruze
1920s American films